"Lose Yourself" is a 2002 song by Eminem.

Lose Yourself may also refer to:

 "Lose Yourself" (Entourage), a 2010 episode of Entourage
 "Lose Yourself" (Instant Star), an episode of Instant Star
 "Lose Yourself", an instrumental by Clint Mansell from Black Swan: Original Motion Picture Soundtrack
 "Lose Yourself" (The Flash), a 2018 episode of The Flash

See also
 "Lose Yourself to Dance", a 2013 single by Daft Punk featuring Pharrell Williams